Richard S. Kaufman was born in Philadelphia, Pennsylvania. He graduated from Haverford High School and later earned a bachelor's degree from Temple University, where his studies focused on Television, Radio and Film. During his senior year of college, Kaufman worked at the local ABC affiliate as a student on-camera host for Youth Perspective.

Early career 
His career in entertainment kicked off at EJ Stewart, where he learned production firsthand as a grip, gaffer and a cameraman. He was later hired as a Technical Director for a local Philly television station, WTAF 29 Philadelphia. In Kaufman's early 20s, he was the game show host of Comcast Cable's At the End of Your Rope.
In his mid 20s, Kaufman moved to New York. One of his first assignments there was to work on USA Network's "Night Flight." Kaufman expanded his career by editing MTV music videos and a variety of commercials.

Los Angeles 
Kaufman was mentored by director Marty Callner, who taught him new age techniques for cutting music videos and concerts. Kaufman created videos for singer Stevie Nicks and the bands Whitesnake, Fleetwood Mac and Heart. He also edited American television situation comedies such as 227, New Love American Style and online edited MacGyver.

In the late 1980s, Kaufman started a 10-year run at New Wave Entertainment. During this time, Kaufman edited and produced trailers for films such as Pretty Woman, Cocktail, and Sister Act. After the release of the Sister Act trailer, the Chicago Tribune noted, "Whoever edited the trailer has a much better idea of what's good in this material than the man who directed the movie."[1]

Kaufman later became a partner of New Wave Entertainment but eventually sold his interest in the company to start his own production company, Goodspot. The creative boutique specializes in media across all platforms.

In 2009, Kaufman was nominated for an Emmy for Producing the Ribbon of Hope Awards. He also directed the live to tape six-camera production. Kaufman has also directed other multi-camera productions including the Live From the Red Carpet Daytime Emmy Awards Preshow. Kaufman has also worked for the Aspen Music Festival, producing nearly a dozen classical music concerts streamed live over the internet.

Original productions 

Kaufman co-created "Real Life: The Musical," which sold to ITV and debuted on Oprah Winfrey Network (OWN) in the summer of 2012.  In 2013, he produced an ad campaign for ABC's anti-bullying initiative with GLESN.

Political projects 
In 2004, Kaufman worked on the trailer for The Hunting of the President, a documentary about President Bill Clinton. In recent years, Kaufman has collaborated on a number of projects featuring former Secretary of State Hillary Rodham Clinton. In 2008, Kaufman produced the critically acclaimed tribute film introducing Hillary Clinton at the Democratic National Convention.

Since 2009, Kaufman's company has created four films on Worldwide Food Security for then Secretary of State Clinton, all narrated by actor Matt Damon.

In November 2012, Kaufman produced another Clinton project for Haim Saban, a Clinton donor and founder of the Saban Center for Middle East Policy at the Brookings Institution. The short film screened at the Center's annual dinner, where Hillary Clinton was the keynote speaker. The film featured interviews with Israeli Prime Minister Benjamin Netanyahu, former British Prime Minister Tony Blair, former Secretary of State Henry Kissinger and President Barack Obama. The project praised Clinton's career achievements. The project drew positive reviews; The New York Times reported the video “roared,” while the Washington Post exclaimed, “I am momentarily distracted by the pure excitement I felt simply watching such high value campaign film-making art.” The project garnered additional media coverage from The Washington Post, MSNBC, CBS and NBC’s “Meet the Press” and on CNN’s “The Situation Room.”

Kaufman completed two congressional TV campaigns for Democratic National Committee Chair Debbie Wasserman Schultz, which included a 2012 ad. He also completed a short for The Shriver Report with journalist and former California First Lady Maria Shriver.

Documentaries 
In 2013 Kaufman produced and directed Oscar de la Renta: An American Icon, a documentary celebrating the life of the word-renowned fashion icon. Produced in conjunction with the Clinton Foundation, the project featured personal interviews with Anna Wintour, Barbara Walters, Diane Von Furstenberg and the Clinton family. It premiered at the Clinton Presidential Center and was also screened during an event honoring de la Renta at New York's Carnegie Hall.

A new version of the film featured Laura Bush—another former First Lady for whom de la Renta designed dresses—and was screened at the George W. Bush Presidential Library. Kaufman has additionally produced projects for fashion brands such as Cole Haan, Nike and BCBG.

Kaufman has been to Israel many times in the last three years to direct fundraising films on behalf of Haim Saban and the Jewish charity he supports, the FIDF.

In 2016, Kaufman directed a short film with Robert Redford at the Sundance Film Festival for the NEA. The project was nominated for an Emmy and a Producer's Guild Award.

Kaufman is currently in post-production on two feature-length documentaries he has directed, one follows the internationally acclaimed Carnegie Hall National Youth Orchestra  on an unprecedented sixteen-day concert tour of China. The second called the Last Salute was filmed on location at Auschwitz – Birkenau and reunites Holocaust survivors with their Liberators. A scene from the film has been viewed on Facebook over 66 million times.

Kaufman has traveled extensively through China to research and develop a feature film he is producing in China  based on an original screenplay written by the Academy Awarding screenwriter of Rain Man and My Best Friend's Wedding, Ron Bass.

Kaufman raised American Quarter Horses for over twenty years with his wife. Their stallion, DON'TMESSWITHMYCHIC rose to become a world champion competitor,  winning second place in the 2005 World Reigning competition.  Kaufman is an alumni Big Brother of the Big Brothers program.

Kaufman can't resist a good Philly Cheese Steak or soft pretzels!

References 

http://articles.chicagotribune.com/1996-07-05/features/9607050076_1_trailer-movie-studio-distributed

Year of birth missing (living people)
Living people
Businesspeople from Philadelphia
Television producers from Pennsylvania
Temple University alumni